The Loange River (or Luangué, Luange) is a tributary of the Kasai River. Originating in Angola, the river flows north into the Democratic Republic of the Congo, through the eastern part of Kwango. The river then continues north along the boundary between Kwilu and Kasai provinces to its mouth on the Kasai.

References

Rivers of Angola
Rivers of the Democratic Republic of the Congo
Kwango
Kwilu Province
Kasaï Province
Kasai River
International rivers of Africa